The Tatrapan is a 6x6 special military vehicle produced by the Slovak defence industry company VYVOJ Martin Developed for various utilization by Slovak armed forces as well as export purposes.

Design 
Tatrapan is an armoured off-road vehicle built on the military version of the Tatra 815 chassis. The vehicle has a cab for a driver and a commander of the vehicle and a superstructure body which can be modified and equipped for various applications. The superstructure body is designed as an autonomous unit and its crew can work independently also as a permanent autonomous station. Quick release clamps with centering pins provide a means for fastening the body, thus enabling application of various bodies on a single chassis. Maximum time required to replace a body is 60 minutes.

A specially constructed V-shaped bottom provides increased protection against mine explosions.

Versions
 Tatrapan Zasa - Personnel carrier
 Tatrapan AMB - Ambulance version
 Tatrapan VSRV - Command post vehicle
 Tatrapan MOD - Version with Deutz engine and automatic transmission

Service
The first Tatrapan prototype entered service in 1994. Till 2009, there were about 50 vehicles produced for the Slovak and Cypriot National Guard armies.

Operators
: 70+
: small number
: Marine Corps

See also
 Sisu Pasi

External links
Tatrapan official site

Infantry fighting vehicles
Armoured personnel carriers of the post–Cold War period
Armoured personnel carriers of Slovakia
Military vehicles introduced in the 1990s
Wheeled armoured fighting vehicles
Six-wheeled vehicles